Tykevius Chandler (born May 12, 1998) is an American football running back for the Minnesota Vikings of the National Football League (NFL). He played college football at Tennessee before transferring to North Carolina.

Early life and high school
Chandler grew up in Nashville, Tennessee and attended Montgomery Bell Academy. He was named Tennessee Mr. Football as a junior and as a senior.

College career
Chandler began his collegiate career at Tennessee. He played at Tennessee from 2017–2020 under head coaches Butch Jones and Jeremy Pruitt. 

In the 2018 season, Chandler became the first running back in school history to have a receiving touchdown in three consecutive games. Chandler rushed for 2,046 yards and 13 touchdowns in four seasons at Tennessee. Following the end of his senior season, he entered the NCAA transfer portal.

Chandler committed to transfer to the University of North Carolina and joined the team as a graduate transfer under head coach Mack Brown. He had five games on the season scoring multiple touchdowns, including a 198-yard performance against Virginia and a 213-yard performance against Wake Forest. In the Wake Forest game, he had four rushing touchdowns. In his lone season with the team, he rushed for 1,092 yards and 13 touchdowns on 182 carries and was named second-team All-Atlantic Coast Conference.

Professional career

Chandler was selected by the Minnesota Vikings with 169th overall pick in the fifth round of the 2022 NFL Draft. He was placed on injured reserve on October 11, 2022, with a thumb injury. He was activated on December 28. In the Vikings' Week 18 game against the Chicago Bears, he recorded six carries for 20 rushing yards. He appeared in three games in his rookie season.

References

External links

 Minnesota Vikings bio
Tennessee Volunteers bio
North Carolina Tar Heels bio

1998 births
Living people
American football running backs
Tennessee Volunteers football players
North Carolina Tar Heels football players
Players of American football from Nashville, Tennessee
Minnesota Vikings players